George Greene (April 15, 1817 – June 23, 1880) was a lawyer, justice of the Iowa Supreme Court, railroad entrepreneur, businessman, philanthropist, and one of the founders of Cedar Rapids, Iowa.

Early life
Greene was born in Alton, Staffordshire, England on April 15, 1817 to Robert Greene and Sefer Woodward. His parents were natives of Staffordshire, as were his two younger brothers William and Joseph. The family moved to the United States when he was two years old. They settled in Buffalo, New York. His father died in 1825, and his mother returned to England by herself, in hope of obtaining some property that she believed owned to her. She died in England in 1827 and George, at the age of 10, became an orphan with his brothers. During the next four years he had to provide for himself and his younger brothers. Then he attempted to return to England to recover the property his mother failed to secure. He had to work for his passage to England, and find employment once he got there. He did not reclaim the property and had to work for his passage back to the United States. When he returned, he decided that he would focus on his education, hoping that it would help him gain what he could not through inheritance. He studied one year at Carysville Collegiate Seminary, a year at Aurora Seminary, and two years at French's Collegiate Institute in Geneva, New York. During these four years he taught school as well, and did any other work he could find. He then took up the study of law, with the intention of making it his life profession. He studied with the Hon. George P. Baker in Buffalo, New York. He assisted in Baker's office and was bookkeeper for Dr. Chapin—whom he lived with—to meet his expenses during that time.

Career
In the spring of 1838, Greene moved to the Territory of Iowa. In Davenport, Iowa he was employed by David J. Owen, who was making a geological survey of the territory. He spent six months surveying, which helped him gain a better knowledge of the lands. After this, he moved to Ivanhoe, Iowa and taught school while continuing his law studies. In 1840, he was admitted to the bar in Iowa City, Iowa. He moved to Marion, Iowa, and began practicing law. That year, he was chosen to represent Cedar, Jones, and Linn counties in the Council of the Third Legislative Assembly as a Democrat. He was re-elected to the following year to the Fourth Legislative Assembly. In 1845, he moved to Dubuque, Iowa, and became the editor of the Miners' Express. In Dubuque he began practicing law again, this time in partnership with J. J. Dyer.

Greene's law practice was so successful that he was appointed to be a justice of the Iowa Supreme Court in 1847, to fill the vacancy left by Justice Thomas Stokeley Wilson. He served from November 1, 1847 to January 9, 1855. He was also the reporter of the Supreme Court, so he compiled the decisions of the court in the four-volume G. Greene Reports. In 1849, he became one of the founders of Cedar Rapids, Iowa by surveying and laying out the site of the town. He began living in Cedar Rapids in 1851. He also contributed to the financial development of the city. During the Panic of 1857 he was connected with the management of nine banks in the city.

In 1859, Greene formed a law partnership with Cyrus Bently in Chicago, Illinois. He practiced law and lived there for five years. In the winter of 1864 he moved to McGregor, Iowa and helped his brothers build the McGregor Western Railroad. During this time, and several years later, he helped build the Rockford, Rock Island & St. Louis Railroad. He returned to Cedar Rapids after this, and began practicing law with Judge Dudley and his son-in-law A. S. Belt. The firm represented the Chicago & Northwestern Railroad. Greene continued to be involved with railroads, and became president of the Burlington, Cedar Rapids & Minnesota Railroad, which he took an active part in building. When the railroad went bankrupt it was purchased and operated under the name Burlington, Cedar Rapids & Northern Railroad. He constructed several smaller railroads in Iowa, Illinois, Minnesota, Missouri, and Kansas.

In addition to being a successful lawyer and business man, Greene founded the Grace Episcopal Church, donated the grounds for the church and rectory, and also served as the warden of it. He served as president of the board of trustees of Coe Collegiate Institute, which was later renamed Coe College. In 1872, he changed his party affiliation from Democrat to Republican. Greene was also a mason and was first Past Master of Crescent Lodge #25, Cedar Rapids (1851–52). He died in his home in Cedar Rapids, Iowa on June 23, 1880, and is buried at Oak Hill Cemetery.

Placenames
 Greene Square Park, Cedar Rapids, Iowa
 Greene's Opera House, Cedar Rapids, Iowa
 Greene Brothers’ Store, town's first major department store, Cedar Rapids, Iowa
 Greene Residence Hall at Coe College, Coe's first Board President, Cedar Rapids, Iowa
 Greene mansion, now part of Mount Mercy College, Cedar Rapids, Iowa
 Greene Avenue NE, between I and J Avenue NE Cedar Rapids, Iowa
 Greene, Iowa

Family
On May 30, 1838, Greene married Harriet Merritt. Harriet was from Buffalo, New York and was the daughter of Jesse Merritt and Harriet Hilton. They had four children: George W. (b. April 4, 1839), Susan H. (b. March 3, 1841), Mary Ely (b. June 7, 1843), and Edward Merritt (b. March 29, 1845). George W. and Mary Ely died as infants. Harriet died in Dubuque on April 25, 1850; Greene remarried on January 25, 1855 to Frances R. Graves, who was from Cooperstown, New York. Her parents were Clavin Graves and Fanny Carlisle. They had eight children: Calvin G. (b. February 18, 1856), Fanny C. (b. January 19, 1858), George (b. December 28, 1859), William J. (b. November 28, 1861), Elizabeth (b. August 13, 1864), Robert C. (b. December 22, 1867), Francis (b. May 14, 1870), and Woodward K. (b. August 2, 1873).

Notes

References
 Brewer, Luther A. and Barthinius L. Wick (1911). History of Linn County Iowa Volume I Chicago: The Pioneer Publishing Company
 Gue, Benjamin F. (1903). History of Iowa from the Earliest Times to the Beginning of the Twentieth Century Volume III New York City: The Century History Company
 Gue, Benjamin F. (1903). History of Iowa from the Earliest Times to the Beginning of the Twentieth Century Volume IV New York City: The Century History Company

1817 births
1880 deaths
People from Alton, Staffordshire
Iowa Democrats
Iowa Republicans
Iowa lawyers
Members of the Iowa Territorial Legislature
19th-century American politicians
Justices of the Iowa Supreme Court
Politicians from Buffalo, New York
Politicians from Cedar Rapids, Iowa
British emigrants to the United States
People from Marion, Iowa
19th-century American judges
19th-century American lawyers
American city founders